Matthew Simon Taylor (born 27 November 1981) is an English professional football coach, manager and former player who was most recently head coach of League Two club Walsall.

As a player, Taylor was a full-back, wing-back and midfielder in the Premier League for Portsmouth, Bolton Wanderers, West Ham United and Burnley and in the Football League for Luton Town, Northampton Town and Swindon Town. He scored 84 goals in 658 league games in a 20-year career in English football.

Taylor began his coaching career while still a player at Swindon Town and, upon retiring from playing in 2019, he moved to Tottenham Hotspur to coach their U18s. He landed his first Football League management job in May 2021, taking over as head coach of Walsall.

Club career

Luton Town
Taylor was born in Oxford, Oxfordshire. He began his career at Second Division Luton Town, making his debut as a 17-year-old at the beginning of the 1999–2000 season. He soon made the left wing-back slot his own and won the Luton Young Player of the Season award in his first ever season as a professional, before he won the Player of the Season award in 2000–01. However, despite having an excellent season, he couldn't prevent Luton being relegated to the Third Division. The 2001–02 season saw Luton win promotion as Third Division runners-up, with Taylor scoring 11 league goals and being named in the PFA Third Division Team of the Year.

Portsmouth
His displays led to interest from Premier League clubs, but he instead decided, in July 2002, to sign for First Division team Portsmouth for £750,000. The fee was set averting the need for a tribunal, causing Luton manager Joe Kinnear to lament: "at least Dick Turpin had the decency to wear a mask".

Usually playing as a left wing-back in a 3–5–2 formation, his speedy breaks down the left flank in support of the attack were a feature of Portsmouth's play as they won the First Division title in May 2003. As well as being a regular in the team during the season, he also scored seven goals in the League.

An injury picked up in the later stages of the previous season meant that Taylor was unavailable for the start of Portsmouth's first Premiership season. After returning to fitness, Taylor struggled to win his place in the side back due to the side's good early season form and Harry Redknapp's switch to the 4–4–2 formation. Taylor eventually won a place in the Pompey team at left back, where he was a regular in the second half of the 2003–04 season and appeared to be regaining form. Despite failing to score a league goal in his Premiership debut season, Taylor did hit the equaliser in an FA Cup tie at Anfield on 15 February 2004, when he ran the length of the pitch to celebrate with the supporters after a forceful right-footed finish at the Kop End.

Taylor's first Premiership goal came against Middlesbrough on 1 February 2005. The summer signing of David Unsworth from Everton meant Taylor only became a regular in the side in the second half of the season.

New manager Alain Perrin utilised Taylor as a left midfielder during the 2005–06 season. On 29 October 2005, he scored from 40 yards at Sunderland's Stadium of Light, winning the BBC Goal of the Month. Spotting the goalkeeper Kelvin Davis off his line, Taylor hit a dipping left-footed half-volley over Davis' head and into the back of the net. Portsmouth had been trailing Sunderland 1–0 in the crucial "six-pointer" but Taylor inspired a second half comeback with two goals and two assists in a 4–1 victory. When Harry Redknapp returned, Taylor initially retained his attacking role but the arrival of Andrés D'Alessandro on loan and Redknapp's disapproval of Perrin's left-back, Grégory Vignal, meant that Taylor returned to full-back for the latter stages of the season. 2005–06 could be considered Taylor's breakthrough season as a Premiership footballer. In all he played 34 league games, scoring six goals. Two of these were crucial penalties; one in the last minute against Sunderland to secure a 2–1 win, and another in an away game at Wigan Athletic on 29 April 2006 to clinch another 2–1 win and survival from relegation.

His good form for Portsmouth attracted interest from Tottenham Hotspur and Fulham, but he signed a long-term contract with Portsmouth in July 2006. In the 2006–07 season, Taylor was a regular in the Portsmouth side on the left of midfield. Despite the team's good form, it took until early December for him to score his first league goal, in a game against Aston Villa. He then added a second from the penalty spot in the same match before going on to score spectacular volleys in the next two games against Everton and Arsenal.

His first-half goal against Manchester United at Fratton Park in April 2007 sent Portsmouth on their way to a 2–1 victory over the Premier League champions. His final goal for Portsmouth was a penalty kick in August 2007, in a 3–1 win over Bolton Wanderers, the club he moved to five months later.

Bolton Wanderers

After losing his place in the Portsmouth team to Niko Kranjčar in the first half of the 2007–08 season, Taylor moved to Bolton Wanderers on 17 January 2008 for an undisclosed fee, after rejecting an offer from Sunderland. On 29 March 2008, Taylor scored his first goals for Bolton with a brace in the 3–2 home defeat to Arsenal. On 11 May 2008, Taylor scored his first away goal for Bolton with a last minute equaliser, gaining Bolton a 1–1 draw against Chelsea on the last day of the 2007–08 Premier League season. In July 2008, having previously worn number 32, Taylor was given the number 7 shirt previously worn by Stelios Giannakopoulos. Taylor scored the 50th goal of his career in a 3–1 win at West Ham United on 5 October 2008 and reached double figures in the league for the first time when scoring against Chelsea on 11 April 2009. In July 2009, he signed a new long-term contract at Bolton Wanderers. In the 2009–10 season, after the Blackburn Rovers game blood tests showed that Taylor had developed glandular fever.

West Ham United
On 23 July 2011, Taylor signed for West Ham United for an undisclosed fee on a three-year contract. He made his competitive debut on 7 August 2011 in 1–0 home defeat to Cardiff City and scored his first goal in West Ham's 4–3 win over his former club, Portsmouth, on 10 September.

Burnley
On 4 July 2014, newly promoted Premier League club Burnley confirmed that they had signed Taylor from West Ham United on a two-year deal, on a free transfer. Taylor played in Burnley's first three games of the 2014–15 season but sustained an Achilles' heel injury for which he underwent surgery in October 2014. Taylor returned to the first team on 11 April 2015, coming on as a late substitute in a 1–0 home defeat to Arsenal. In his third game back, he missed a penalty kick which would have put Burnley 1–0 up in an important game against Leicester City to avoid relegation from the Premier League. Leicester won the game 1–0 scoring 59 seconds after Taylor had missed his penalty.

Taylor was released by Burnley at the end of 2015–16 season after making 37 appearances, scoring four goals.

Northampton Town
On 1 August 2016, Taylor signed for newly promoted League One club Northampton Town on a one-year contract. He debuted on the opening day of 2016–17 in a 1–1 draw at home to Fleetwood Town. His first goal for Northampton came from a 20-yard free kick in a 3–2 victory at home to Milton Keynes Dons on 4 September, and this was followed up with a goal in the following match, a 2–0 win at home to Walsall. Taylor finished the season with 48 appearances and eight goals, and signed a one-year contract extension after a clause in his contract was triggered.

Swindon Town
On 22 August 2017, Taylor signed for League Two club Swindon Town on a one-year contract. Four days later, Taylor made his debut during Swindon's 3–0 home defeat against Crawley Town, replacing Amine Linganzi in the 53rd minute. On 22 September 2017, Taylor scored his first goal for Swindon in their 2–0 away victory over newly promoted Forest Green Rovers, doubling the visitors lead in the 91st minute.

On 6 June 2018, Taylor signed a new one-year deal with Swindon, agreeing to continue his player/coach role. In March 2019, Taylor announced his intention to retire from football at the end of the 2018–19 season.

Coaching career

Taylor completed his coaching badges during his playing career and spent time working alongside Luton Town’s under-16s team while at West Ham United.

He was named interim manager at Swindon Town following the resignation of David Flitcroft on 1 March 2018  and took charge of just one game before transitioning into a player-coach role following the appointment of Phil Brown as manager.

Tottenham Hotspur

Taylor was appointed head coach of Tottenham Hotspur Under-18s upon his retirement from football in 2019.

A number of players he developed during his time in north London went onto make professional debuts and included Alfie Devine, Kion Etete, Nile John, Harvey White and Dane Scarlett.

Walsall

Taylor was approached by Walsall to become manager while at Tottenham Hotspur and agreed to join the club at the end of the season in 2021.

Tasked with overhauling the senior squad and establishing a new playing style ahead of his first step into management, Taylor recorded his first win against Stevenage 1-0 on 28 August 2021.

He was then nominated for League Two Manager of the Month in October having recorded just three defeats in 14 games during a run of good form across all competitions.

Taylor was relieved of his duties at the club on 9 February 2022.

Career statistics

Managerial statistics

Honours
Luton Town
Football League Third Division runner-up: 2001–02

Portsmouth
Football League First Division winner: 2002–03

West Ham United
Football League Championship play-offs winner: 2011–12

Burnley
Football League Championship winner: 2015–16

Individual
Luton Town Young Player of the Season: 1999–2000
Luton Town Player of the Season: 2000–01
PFA Third Division Team of the Year: 2001–02
PFA First Division Team of the Year: 2002–03
Swindon Town Player of the Season: 2017–18

References

External links

Matthew Taylor profile at the Swindon Town F.C. website

1981 births
Living people
Footballers from Oxford
English footballers
England under-21 international footballers
Association football midfielders
Luton Town F.C. players
Portsmouth F.C. players
Bolton Wanderers F.C. players
West Ham United F.C. players
Burnley F.C. players
Northampton Town F.C. players
Swindon Town F.C. players
English Football League players
Premier League players
English football managers
Swindon Town F.C. managers
English Football League managers
Swindon Town F.C. non-playing staff
Tottenham Hotspur F.C. non-playing staff
Walsall F.C. managers
Association football coaches